Foxhead may refer to:

"Foxhead", an episode of The Outsider (miniseries)
Sheraton on the Falls, Niagara Falls, Canada, once known as the Sheraton-Foxhead